The West Virginia Mountaineers football statistical leaders are individual statistical leaders of the West Virginia Mountaineers football program in various categories, including passing, rushing, receiving, total offense, all-purpose yardage, defensive stats, and kicking. Within those areas, the lists identify single-game, single-season, and career leaders. The Mountaineers represent West Virginia University in the NCAA's Big 12 Conference.

Although West Virginia began competing in intercollegiate football in 1891, the school's official record book considers the "modern era" to have begun in 1933. Records from before this year are often incomplete and inconsistent, and they are generally not included in these lists. However, the West Virginia Football Media Guide does include the touchdown statistics, although not the yards, of Ira Errett Rodgers, who played for the Mountaineers from 1915 to 1919.

These lists are dominated by more recent players for several reasons:
 Since 1933, seasons have increased from 10 games to 11 and then 12 games in length.
 The NCAA didn't allow freshmen to play varsity football until 1972 (with the exception of the World War II years), allowing players to have four-year careers.
 Bowl games only began counting toward single-season and career statistics in 2002. The Mountaineers have played in 14 bowl games since the decision, with a 15th now assured in 2018, giving players an extra game to accumulate statistics.
 The Mountaineers ran a high-octane spread option offense under head coaches Rich Rodriguez (2001-2007) and Bill Stewart (2008-2010), which emphasized mobile quarterbacks and no huddling, allowing the teams to rack up very large numbers of yards. Since Dana Holgorsen took over in 2011, the Mountaineers have run more of an air raid spread attack, emphasizing passing on most plays. This has led to many school passing and receiving records being set. In particular, a 70–63 win over Baylor in 2012 saw more than 1,500 offensive yards between the two teams combined, and 10 single-game entries on the lists below.

These lists are updated through the end of the 2019 season.

Passing

Passing yards

Passing touchdowns

Rushing

Rushing yards

Rushing touchdowns

Receiving

Receptions

Receiving yards

Receiving touchdowns

Total offense
Total offense is the sum of passing and rushing statistics. It does not include receiving or returns.

Total offense yards

Touchdowns responsible for
"Touchdowns responsible for" is the NCAA's official term for combined passing and rushing touchdowns.

All-purpose yardage
All-purpose yardage is the sum of all yards credited to a player who is in possession of the ball. It includes rushing, receiving, and returns, but does not include passing.

West Virginia's 2018 media guide fully lists single-game all-purpose yardage records, but does not break them down by individual statistics.

Defense
Note: Recent West Virginia football media guides have not generally listed a top 10 in the defensive categories. This has been confirmed true for both the 2014 and 2018 editions.

Interceptions

Tackles

Sacks

Kicking

Field goals made

Field goal percentage

Footnotes

References

Lists of college football statistical leaders by team
Statistical Leaders